The Middle East were an Australian indie folk band formed in Townsville, Queensland in 2005. The group played locally initially but grew to become a national and international touring band. The band's name has no particular significance - it was coined for a show poster of the then temporary project, after co-frontman Rohin Jones watched a documentary on Yasser Arafat.

In early 2008, the band released a compilation album called The Recordings of The Middle East before splitting up. Eight months after this decision was made, band members reconvened and later re-released an abridged version of the debut album, The Recordings of the Middle East as an EP in May 2009 through Spunk Records in Australia.

The Middle East's first studio album, I Want That You Are Always Happy was released in Australia and New Zealand on 8 April 2011. The band played its last show on 31 July 2011, at the Splendour in the Grass festival in Woodford, Queensland.

History
The Middle East has received national radio airplay on Triple J and slots on several major Australian festivals such as Splendour in the Grass, Big Day Out, Big Sound, Homebake, and the Woodford Folk Festival. As well as this, the band has toured with international bands such as British group Doves and has also achieved minor, developing interest in the United States, where The Recordings of The Middle East was released. Much of the interest surrounding the band can be related back to the blogosphere, with indie blog I Guess I'm Floating introducing the band stateside in May 2009. Thereafter, The Middle East had over one hundred blog entries from around the world writing about the band.
With the release of The Recordings of the Middle East, Pitchfork offered a free download of the song "The Darkest Side" as a part of its weekly "forkcast". The Middle East was also nominated and won the Triple J 2009 ‘Unearthed’ Award.

In October 2009, it was announced that the band would be opening for US band Grizzly Bear in their Melbourne shows. The band was also announced as the support act for one of the band's Sydney Festival shows. On 11 November 2009, it was announced that the band would be part of the festival Big Day Out, announced as part of the second line up, in East Coast areas.

Band members announced at Splendour in the Grass festival in August 2011 that their set that night would be their "last show ever." They released a statement to fans, explaining why the band had broken up for the second time by saying: "we don't feel like playing any more for a whole lot of reasons that I won't list here and I'm afraid if we continue any longer it would just be a money grab." FasterLouder reported that the band thanked all in attendance, saying "it makes it special for us." Triple J presenter Dom Alessio reacted to the news on Twitter, adding that it was "an amazing band cutting it short before their time."

In March 2019, it was confirmed that the band would return for two nights only to perform at the Sydney Opera House as a part of Vivid Live to celebrate the 20th anniversary of Spunk Records. The band were joined by Jack Ladder, Holly Throsby, Machine Translations, The Ocean Party (playing their final show) and Emma Russack.

Musical style
The Middle East has been described as playing within "a multitude of genres and styles". Elements of country, blues, punk, rock, folk, chamber pop, psych folk, post-rock and ambience can be found throughout its music. Allmusic describes the band's sound as "lush, orchestral indie pop that blends the epic atmospherics of modern rock outfits like Múm and Sigur Rós with the earthy simplicity of modern indie folk". Instruments used include guitar—both electric and acoustic, drums, hand percussion, piano, glockenspiel, banjo and trumpet. Another distinguishing feature of the band's music is the use of vocal harmony—in particular close harmony performed at times by several members. Pitchfork described some The Middle East songs as being " simple, finger-plucked acoustic affair with alternating and harmonizing vocals that lend the hushed track a sense of beleaguered hope".

The band, however, has always been critical of itself and its style, believing as an entity it had yet to do anything unique and was too easy to pigeonhole.

The band's song "Blood" is featured in the films It's Kind of a Funny Story (2010), Crazy, Stupid, Love (2011), Accidents Happen (2009), Jeff, Who Lives at Home (2011) and A Perfect Pairing (2022).

Discography

Studio albums

Compilation albums

Extended plays

Singles

Awards and nominations

APRA Awards
The APRA Awards are presented annually from 1982 by the Australasian Performing Right Association (APRA), "honouring composers and songwriters". They commenced in 1982.

! 
|-
| 2010 
| "Blood" (Jordan Ireland, Rohin Jones)
| Song of the Year
| 
| 
|-

ARIA Music Awards
The ARIA Music Awards is an annual awards ceremony that recognises excellence, innovation, and achievement across all genres of Australian music.

|-
| ARIA Music Awards of 2011
|I Want That You Are Always Happy
| ARIA Award for Breakthrough Artist - Album
| 
|-

Australian Music Prize
The Australian Music Prize (the AMP) is an annual award of $30,000 given to an Australian band or solo artist in recognition of the merit of an album released during the year of award. It commenced in 2005.

|-
| 2011
|I Want That You Are Always Happy
| Australian Music Prize
| 
|-

J Awards
The J Awards are an annual series of Australian music awards that were established by the Australian Broadcasting Corporation's youth-focused radio station Triple J. They commenced in 2005.

|-
| J Awards of 2009
| themselves
| Unearthed Artist of the Year
| 
|-
| J Awards of 2011
|I Want That You Are Always Happy
| Australian Album of the Year
|

Queensland Music Awards
The Queensland Music Awards (previously known as Q Song Awards) are annual awards celebrating Queensland, Australia's brightest emerging artists and established legends. They commenced in 2006.

 (wins only)
|-
| 2011
| I Want That You Are Always Happy
| Album of the Year
| 
|-
|}

References

External links
 The Middle East on MySpace
 The Middle East on Facebook

Australian indie rock groups
Queensland musical groups
Musical groups established in 2005
Musical groups disestablished in 2019